Earl Cooley (1911–2009) spent his career working in the U.S. Forest Service (USFS), where he was concerned with developing new methods of fighting forest fires. In 1940, he was one of the first U.S. firefighters to  parachute from a plane onto a wildfire. Cooley went on to train others to fight fires by smokejumping. After his retirement from the USFS, he set up the National Smokejumper Association, of which he was president from 1993 to 1995.

Early life 

Cooley was born in Hardin, Montana in 1911.  He was one of 11 children and grew up running through the woods and playing just like a normal kid. Hunting, trapping, and fishing were big parts of his life. He loved anything to do with the outdoors. When he was just a 12-year-old boy, his father suffered a substantial financial setback. (NYTimes). He dropped out of school to help support his family. He relied on his abilities to hunt, fish, trap, and farm in order to help earn money.

Education
He went back to high school and graduated from the class of 1930. After graduation, he went on to attend and graduate from the forestry school at the University of Montana.

Career
In 1937, Cooley started his career with the Forest Service. The agency was looking for ways to improve the methods used to fight fires. Terrain in the mountains in the 1930s was almost inaccessible, and the roads almost nonexistent. (Bramwell). The challenge became focused on finding a way to get to the fire faster. The agency came up with an idea on attaching “water bombs” to a plane to drop on the fire. Although the idea was tested several times, it proved ineffective and was cancelled. (NY times) Cooley thought he could do something with the plane and brought up the idea of smokejumping – parachuting out of an airplane into a fire to get it under control. This had been tried and appeared to prove true in other countries including Russia and Germany. (Bramwell) Many American pilots were unsure about the idea of dropping firefighters into a fire from the air. There are many factors that can go wrong and they were reluctant and hesitant at the idea. Cooley and a partner by the name of Rufus Robinson began to toil with the notion.
On July 12, 1940, Cooley and Robinson got their chance to test their idea. The twenty-eight-year-old who had been building roads, towers, and various other structures for the service was ready for the challenge.  A forest fire had sprung up along Martin Creek in the Naz Perce National Forest. Robinson jumped first followed by Cooley. (Bushey) Their supplies were dropped on the planes’ next pass. (NY times) The next day when the four-man crew reached them, they had the fire under control. They turned around and hiked the 28 miles back to camp. (Bushey).
After the service set up the smokejumpers, Cooley began training other young men on how to do exactly the same thing he did. He trained men for what the National Service called “10 o'clock men”, meaning that they could have the fire out by 10 o'clock, on the morning after they had been dispatched (Bramwell).

Mann Gulch Fire
On August 15, 1949, a fire broke out inside of a gulch in Helena National Forest in Montana. The Canyon, which had cliffs that reached 1,250 at times on both sides, made access for ground crews almost impossible. (Maclean)  Cooley was not actually one of the men who jumped on this run. Instead, he was the spotter. His job was to wait for the plane to fly over the spot previously decided by the incident planning team, and give the men the signal of when to jump. He laid on the floor, next to the open door, with his foreman across from him. Cooley had to take information from the foreman, the pilot, the ground crews, and from what he could see from the air. After denying a few spots, and debating another with the foreman Wag Dodge, he finally decided on the spot he felt would be best to drop the men. (Maclean) The men lined up in groups and he gave them the signal. After four passes, all the jumpers were safely on the ground. 
After the jumpers landed, the plane made one more pass dumping their equipment on to the ground. They gathered it up and went to meet the ground men who were to meet them. The ground men were not where they were supposed to be. The jumpers were on their own. They continued to move on with the task at hand. As they moved along the gulch, they began to angle downward towards the fire. The fire shifted in what is known as a blow-up and turned on the men. The men panicked then tried to outrun the fire. They were quickly overtaken by the flames. There were only three survivors. (Maclean)
This news effected Cooley harshly. He ensured that every body from his crew was recovered before he went home. Fourteen men were killed, just from his jumpers. This doesn't include all the other men who died trying to stop the fire. This is still known as the biggest smokejumper tragedy. When later inquired about the Mann Gulch fire, Cooley said “I am sure I did the right thing that day, but I still look at that map and have thought about it every day since then.” (NYTimes) After the fire, he went with local rangers to see placement of stone and concrete crosses placed on the spots at which each of the men died. It has been said that until his eighties, he would often take trips to ensure the crosses and various plaques, markers, and memorials were still standing. The majority of information on the infamous Mann Gulch fire can be found in Norman Maclean's Young Men and Fire. Maclean sat down with Cooley and the survivors and wrote down the details of this event.  The National Forestry service also has the incident investigation with interviews from Cooley and the three survivors within their archives.

Legacy
Cooley continued to serve and protect people with the service of smokejumping. He went on to train countless jumpers to go into the fire and to get it extinguished quickly. Along with many others whose job is specifically that of studying fire behavior, he worked tirelessly to continually change and evolve the way these men fought the fires.  His goal was to learn something from each jump to make the job safer and more efficient. He served as base superintendent at the jump base in Missoula, Montana until 1975, when he finally retired from the Forestry service Cooley went on to establish the National Smokejumping Association in 1989, of which he served as president from 1993 to 1995, after which he retired from the service all together. He passed away November 9, 2009 at his home from pneumonia.

References

Bramwell, Lincoln. “Firefighters in the Sky.” Magazine of the Western History 2015: 60-69
Bushey, Chuck. “Passing of an Era.” Wildfire 19.1 (n.d.): 4. Print.
Bramwell, Lincoln “History of Smokejumping.” Fire management today 2015: 5-7
Martin, Douglas. “Earl Cooley is Dead at 98; Fought Fires as Original Smokejumper.” The New York Times 15 Nov. 2009, page A32. print
Maclean, Norman. Young Men and Fire. Chicago: U of Chicago, 2017. Print
Sullivan, Patricia. “Smokejumper One of 1st to Make the Leap.” The Washington Post 13 November 2009, B05 sec.: Web.

External links
 Earl Cooley - Daily Telegraph obituary
 Earl Cooley - Facebook page

1911 births
2009 deaths
University of Montana alumni
People from Hardin, Montana
American firefighters